The 2020–21 Chattanooga Mocs women's basketball team represented the University of Tennessee at Chattanooga during the 2020–21 NCAA Division I women's basketball season. The Mocs, led by first-year head coach Katie Burrows, played their home games at the McKenzie Arena as members of the Southern Conference (SoCon).

Previous season
The 2019–20 Chattanooga Mocs women's basketball team represented the University of Tennessee at Chattanooga during the 2019–20 NCAA Division I women's basketball season. The Mocs, led by first-year head coach Katie Burrows, played their home games at the McKenzie Arena as members of the Southern Conference (SoCon). The Mocs finished the season 11–18, 10–4 in third place in the SoCon, losing to Mercer in the first round of the conference tournament.

Schedule
 
|-
!colspan=9 style="background:#00386B; color:#E0AA0F;"| Regular Season
|-

|-
!colspan=9 style="background:#00386B; color:#E0AA0F;"| SoCon Regular Season
|-

References

Chattanooga Mocs women's basketball seasons
Chattanooga
Chattanooga Mocs
Chattanooga Mocs